Eva Pavlíková (born 17 September 1960) is a Slovak actress. At the 2004 Crystal Wing Awards she won in the theatre category, for her work at the Andrej Bagar Theatre in Nitra. She has a daughter, Katarína Kubošiová, who is a singer known as Katarzia.

Selected filmography 
 (1986)
 (1997)
 (television, 2007)
 (television, 2008)
 (television, 2011)
Búrlivé víno (television, 2012)

References

External links

1960 births
Living people
Slovak film actresses
Slovak stage actresses
Slovak television actresses
Actors from Košice
20th-century Slovak actresses
21st-century Slovak actresses